Hanna Karolina Laiho (born December 13, 1975, Lahti) is a retired Finnish rhythmic gymnast.

She competed for Finland in the individual rhythmic gymnastics all-around competition at the 1992 Summer Olympics in Barcelona. She tied for 25th place in the qualification round and didn't advance to the final.

References

External links 
 

1975 births
Living people
Finnish rhythmic gymnasts
Gymnasts at the 1992 Summer Olympics
Olympic gymnasts of Finland
Sportspeople from Lahti